Matias Myttynen (born 12 March 1990) is a Finnish professional ice hockey forward. He is currently playing for Jokerit of the Kontinental Hockey League (KHL).

Myttynen made his SM-liiga debut playing with Ilves during the 2009–10 SM-liiga season before later playing with JYP Jyväskylä and KalPa in the Liiga.

References

External links

1990 births
Living people
Dinamo Riga players
Finnish ice hockey centres
Ilves players
Jokerit players
JYP Jyväskylä players
KalPa players
HC Kunlun Red Star players
VIK Västerås HK players
HC Vityaz players
Ice hockey people from Tampere